Bacchus and Ariadne, Op. 43 is a ballet score by the French composer Albert Roussel written in 1930.

Ballet
Its composition roughly coincides with that of Roussel's Symphony No. 3. It describes the abduction of Ariadne by Dionysus. The Paris Opera premiered the two-act work under the direction of Philippe Gaubert on 22 May 1931, with choreography by Serge Lifar and sets by Giorgio de Chirico.

Orchestral Suites
Roussel created two orchestral suites from the score, the first premiered by Charles Münch on 2 April 1933, and the second by Pierre Monteux a year later.

Style
A late work, the piece reflects Roussel's distinctive orchestration style and his preference for late classical rhythms and harmonies.

Ballets by Albert Roussel
Ballets by Serge Lifar
Ballets designed by Giorgio de Chirico
1931 ballet premieres
Orchestral suites
Dionysus in art
Ariadne